The Protestant People's Party (PPP) was a minor Australian political party which operated in the state of New South Wales (NSW) in the 1940s.

The party contested the 1946 Australian federal election for election to the Senate, in which it gained 7.7% of the vote in NSW (which translated to 3% nationally). This was a particularly  impressive result for a minor party at the time, given the strength of the two-party system in Australia during the 1940s. Nevertheless, the result was insufficient to gain the PPP a parliamentary seat. Three years later, the PPP contested the 1949 Australian federal election, but saw its vote collapse to just 1% of the total NSW Senate vote. The PPP was never successful in winning representation to either the NSW or Australian parliaments.

See also
 List of political parties in Australia

References

External links
 The University of Western Australia - Australian Government and Politics Database

Defunct political parties in New South Wales
Protestant political parties
Defunct Christian political parties